The Green Party (SZ) leadership election of 2007 was held on 16 February 2007. Martin Bursík was reelected for his second term. Bursík was the sole Candidate.

Voting
275 delegates voted. Bursík received 212 votes and thus won the election.

References

Green Party (Czech Republic) leadership elections
Green Party leadership election
Green Party (Czech Republic) leadership election
Indirect elections
Green Party (Czech Republic) leadership election